Desmond Miles is a fictional character from Ubisoft's Assassin's Creed video game franchise. Introduced as the protagonist of the modern-day sections of the first Assassin's Creed game, he has maintained this role for the next four installments, with his journey and development making up the frame story that unites the first five Assassin's Creed titles. Desmond has also been referenced or featured in a smaller capacity in subsequent games in the series, as well as various spin-off media. He is voiced by actor Nolan North, and is modeled after Canadian fashion model Francisco Randez. According to several video game journalists and authors, Desmond's character is meant to represent a form of transcendence symbolically from the necessity of the human body.

In the franchise, Desmond is a descendant of a long line of important characters, including Adam, Aquilus, Altaïr Ibn-La'Ahad, Ezio Auditore da Firenze, Edward Kenway, Haytham Kenway, and Ratonhnhaké:ton / Connor, most of whom were members of the Assassin Brotherhood, a fictional organization inspired by the real-life Order of Assassins that is dedicated to safeguarding peace and freedom. As such, Desmond is born into the Brotherhood and trained as an Assassin from a young age, but his desire to lead a normal life eventually prompts him to run away from home and cut ties with the Assassins. However, he is tracked down and kidnapped by the Templar Order, the Assassins' mortal enemies, who force him into a machine called the Animus that allows Desmond to experience the genetic memories of his ancestors. In doing so, the Templars hope to locate powerful artifacts called Pieces of Eden and enslave all of humanity. Desmond manages to escape from the Templars before they succeed in their goal and, after accepting his Assassin heritage, rejoins the Brotherhood to help them stop the Templars. In the process, he learns that he is destined to save humanity from an impending solar flare, and continues to explore his ancestors' memories to find the technology of a precursor race called the Isu, who were wiped out by a similar disaster.

Critical reception of the character has been mixed, with many reviewers and video game journalists criticizing Desmond as a dull and uninteresting protagonist, whose story arc does not match the quality of the historical plots featured in each of the games. More positive commentary focused on North's performance and the development of Desmond from reluctant outsider to fully fledged member of the Assassin Brotherhood. The decision to have Desmond killed off in Assassin's Creed III also proved controversial, as both critics and players noticed a significant decrease in the importance of the series' modern-day storyline after his death. Nevertheless, Desmond is considered to be a significant part of the franchise's identity.

Creation and development 
According to his voice actor Nolan North, the original plan for Desmond was that he would feature in six games, acquiring the skills of his Assassin ancestors to become "The Ultimate Assassin", and at some point would be able to time-travel between different time periods. North became greatly interested in the concept but was scrapped. Adding upon this, North commented that he saw Desmond as a boring protagonist who ultimately had no direction to go forward, describing the character as "a fork in the road". Desmond has been defined as a MacGuffin, namely that "he exists to move the story forward, but he provides little substance."

Following the release of Assassin's Creed III and the conclusion of Desmond's storyline, lead designer Steve Master said: "What we're trying to do is bring some finality to Desmond's story. To actually wrap up what you've opened and experienced with him." Jean Guesdon, the creative director of the series, later said that Desmond is an important character in the Assassin's Creed series, and that despite his death, he would continue to play an important role in the franchise.

In 2016, Michael Fassbender starred in and co-produced a film adaptation of the series, titled Assassin's Creed. Initially thought to be cast as Desmond, Ubisoft later stated that Fassbender would play a new character, named Callum "Cal" Lynch.

Appearances

Assassin's Creed 
In the first Assassin's Creed, Desmond is introduced as a former Assassin leading a simple life as a bartender in New York City. In order to hide his identity, he lives under assumed names and uses only cash to protect himself. Despite this, he is eventually tracked down and captured by Abstergo Industries, a pharmaceutical company used as a front by the modern-day Templar Order. Once inside Abstergo's facility in Rome, Desmond is forced to enter the Animus, a machine that allows him to relive the memories of his ancestors stored in his DNA. The Animus translates these memories into a three-dimensional environment, where Desmond retains some degree of control, but must remain synchronized with his ancestors' exact actions at any given moment or else he risks being forced to reload the memory or even be kicked out of the Animus. Under the watch of Abstergo's lead scientist, Dr. Warren Vidic, and his assistant Lucy Stillman, Desmond is instructed to relive the memories of Altaïr Ibn-La'Ahad (1165–1257; Syria), to help Abstergo find specific information they are looking for, which Vidic refuses to disclose. Without much choice, Desmond begrudgingly agrees to Vidic's demands, and relives Altaïr's memories from the time of the Third Crusade, in 1191.

After recovering the information for which Abstergo was searchinga map showing the locations of various Pieces of Eden, artifacts with the power to control humans believed to have been created by a Precursor raceVidic's superiors order Desmond to be killed. Lucy's quick thinking saves him, as she persuades Vidic to keep him alive until they know he is of no further use. Upon returning to his room, Desmond, suffering from the "Bleeding Effect" due to prolonged exposure to the Animus, discovers he has gained one of Altaïr's abilities: Eagle Vision. This allows him to discern friend from foe and to read cryptic messages written on walls and floors by Subject 16, the previous Animus test subject that Lucy and Vidic occasionally mention.

Assassin's Creed II 
Assassin's Creed II continues from where the first game left off, as Desmond escapes from the Abstergo facility with the help of Lucy, revealed to be an undercover Assassin. After being taken to the Assassins' hideout, Desmond meets the rest of Lucy's teamhistorian Shaun Hastings and technician Rebecca Craneand enters the Animus 2.0, built by Rebecca, to be quickly trained as an Assassin via the Bleeding Effect. Desmond begins reliving the memories of Ezio Auditore da Firenze (1459–1524; Italy), his ancestor from the Renaissance, in order to graft his skills and abilities onto himself. After successfully navigating Ezio's early memories, Desmond is extracted from the Animus to avoid the mental degradation that Subject 16 suffered as a side-effect of the Bleeding Effect. Soon after, the Bleeding Effect begins to manifest itself, as Desmond involuntarily relives a memory of Altaïr, despite not being linked to the Animus.

After spending more time in Animus 2.0, Desmond begins to adjust to his newly developed skills and becomes a master freerunner and expert fighter, just like his ancestors. The last segment of Ezio's memories brings an astonished Ezio and Desmond to a futuristic chamber underneath the Sistine Chapel, where they are met by a hologram of Minerva, a member of the Precursor race known as the Isu that created humanity and the Pieces of Eden. Minerva addresses Desmond by name, knowing that he is reliving Ezio's memories, and talks about a cataclysm that wiped out most of her race thousands of years ago, and which is set to occur again by the end of that year, if Desmond does not prevent it. Desmond is then pulled from the Animus as Abstergo discovers the Assassins' hideout. As the team escapes to a new hideout, Desmond re-enters the Animus, knowing Ezio and perhaps Subject 16 may have the answers they seek.

Assassin's Creed: Brotherhood 
In Assassin's Creed: Brotherhood, Desmond, Lucy, Shaun, and Rebecca arrive at Monteriggioni, where they set up a safe house in the Villa Auditore's sanctuary. Desmond re-enters the Animus 2.0 to continue reliving Ezio's memories and discover what he did with the Apple of Eden he had obtained, hoping to use the artifact to defeat the Templars and stop the cataclysm Minerva warned him about. After learning Ezio hid the Apple under the  Colosseum once he retrieved it from the Templars and used it to end their reign in Italy, Desmond and the other Assassins head there to retrieve it. Desmond takes the Apple, but through it another Isu named Juno takes control of his body and forces him to stab Lucy, saying that she would have betrayed him if he allowed her to accompany him any further. Desmond then falls into a coma and is placed back into the Animus by two unknown Assassins in a bid to preserve his consciousness.

Assassin's Creed: Revelations 
In Assassin's Creed: Revelations, Desmond awakens within the Black Room, a safe mode area for the Animus. In the Black Room's Animus Island, he meets the digital construct of Subject 16, Clay Kaczmarek, who tells Desmond that he must find a "Synch Nexus", a memory that links him with Altaïr and Ezio, so that the Animus can reintegrate his shattered subconscious and awaken him from his coma. While in this state, Desmond can hear conversations between Shaun, Rebecca, and his father, William Miles, who are concerned about his state, and access five memory sequences, known as "Desmond's Journey", that detail his own life prior to his abduction by Abstergo. In these sequences, Desmond reminisces of his time on "the Farm", where he grew up in secrecy among other Assassins, and his father's harsh training, which eventually prompted him to run away on his 16th birthday, due to not wanting to live the life his parents had chosen for him. After running into some girls from Illinois who drove him to Chicago, Desmond eventually moved to New York, where he got a job at a high-end bar, but always regretted not being able to properly say goodbye to his parents. Eventually, Abstergo found and kidnapped him in September 2012, at which point Desmond blamed himself for not taking his parents' warnings and training more seriously. In the present, Desmond realizes that his easiest days are now behind him and finally accepts his role as an Assassin.

After reliving the memories of Ezio in Constantinopole from 1511 to 1512, the Animus begins to delete Animus Island to get rid of excess data. Clay sacrifices himself to prevent Desmond's consciousness from being deleted, but not before transferring his own genetic memories onto him. Eventually, Desmond is able to find the Synch Nexus: the moment Ezio reached Altaïr's library underneath Masyaf Castle and acknowledged Desmond's presence before unlocking a message from the Isu Jupiter through Altaïr's own Apple of Eden. Jupiter reveals that the Great Catastrophe which ended the Isu was a solar flare that hit the Earth, and directs Desmond to find the Grand Temple, where the Isu have stored most of the data collected over the years, so that he may save humanity before another solar flare occurs in several weeks. Following this, Desmond awakens from his coma to find Shaun, Rebecca, and William next to him, and simply states that he knows what they have to do.

The Lost Archive downloadable content for Revelations expands upon Desmond's time in the Black Room, as he involuntarily experiences Clay's memories prior to the latter's death. Through these memories, he learns that Lucy was in fact a double agent for the Templars, and that his escape from Abstergo was staged as part of "Project Siren". In reality, Vidic had ordered Lucy to extract Desmond to a place where he would feel safe so that he would willingly enter the Animus and facilitate the search for Ezio's Apple of Eden, which Abstergo planned to send to space via satellite in an effort to enslave all of humanity. However, this plan came to a halt when Juno forced Desmond to kill Lucy.

Assassin's Creed III 
In Assassin's Creed III, Desmond, who is noticeably thinner and frail after a long time in the Animus, arrives at the Isu's Grand Temple, located in a cave system in New York, and accesses it using Ezio's Apple of Eden. With the help of his father and friends, Desmond relives the memories of his ancestors Haytham Kenway (1725–1781; Kingdom of Great Britain) and Ratonhnhaké:ton / Connor (1756–unknown; Colonial America) using the new Animus 3.0, hoping to find the Key to the Temple's Central Vault, where the solution to stopping the solar flare is located. During his breaks in-between Animus sessions, Desmond explores the Temple and speaks with Juno, who tells him more of her race's history and their failed attempts to survive the Great Catastrophe. The Assassins also search for Isu batteries to power the Grand Temple and allow them to access the Central Vault, with Desmond being sent to retrieve them due to his superior skills gained through the Bleeding Effect. Desmond successfully retrieves two batteries from Manhattan and São Paulo, where he has run-ins with the Templar Daniel Cross, who was dispatched by Abstergo to capture him. As the date of the solar flare approaches, William volunteers to retrieve the final battery from Cairo so Desmond can locate the Key, but is captured by Abstergo and taken to their Rome facility in an attempt to get Desmond to surrender his Apple of Eden. Instead, Desmond stroms the facility to rescue his father, killing Cross, Warren Vidic and any guard standing in his way. After freeing William, Desmond reconciles with him and recovers the final battery from Vidic's office.

After retrieving the Key from where Connor hid it per Juno's instructions, Desmond and his allies enter the Central Vault, discovering a pedestal. The holograms of Minerva and Juno then appear, with the former warning Desmond not to touch the pedestal, as it would kill him and release Juno, who was imprisoned in the Temple to prevent her from conquering humanity. In response, Juno shows Desmond a vision of what would happen if the solar flare hits the Earth: although Desmond will become a messiah-like figure to other survivors and will be revered as a god after his death, future generations will manipulate his legacy for their personal gain. After several moments of consideration, Desmond decides to release Juno, believing humanity has a better chance at fighting her than rebuilding society after the solar flare. As Shaun, Rebecca, and William exit the Temple, Desmond touches the pedestal, which frees Juno and activates a protective shield around the Earth that stops the solar flare, at the cost of his own life.

Assassin's Creed IV: Black Flag 
Despite his death, Desmond remains a powerful asset for the Templars and Assassins in Assassin's Creed IV: Black Flag. Shortly after his death, a recovery team from Abstergo is sent to collect samples from his body for their new Sample 17 Project. His DNA is stored in Abstergo Entertainment's servers, where a crew of analysts is tasked with reliving his copied genetic memories and learning about his ancestors. One of them, the player character, is tasked with reliving the memories of Edward Kenway (1693–1735; Wales), Haytham Kenway's father and Connor's grandfather, during his time operating as a pirate in the West Indies. While this is ostensibly to gather data for an Animus-powered interactive feature film about Edward's life, in reality Abstergo seeks to find the Observatory, an Isu structure hosting an advanced tracking device and several vials of the Isu's blood samples. During their research, the player character steals and sends back to the Assassins several recordings left by Desmond detailing his initial doubts of leaving the Farm, his acceptance of the role he had been chosen to play, and his love for his parents. Because Abstergo can now collect anyone's genetic memories without having to use blood-related analysts, his body gives Abstergo full knowledge about his family life.

Assassin's Creed Syndicate 
In 2015, during the events of Assassin's Creed Syndicate, a boy named Elijah is brought by his mother to an Abstergo clinic in New York City. Abstergo analysts discover that the boy shares exactly the same patrilineal lineage of Desmond, indicating that he may have been unknowingly conceived by him a few years after his escape from the Farm. On top of that, it is also revealed that the boy is a Sage, the reincarnation of a member of the Isu species. An Abstergo researcher proposes to kidnap the boy and conduct vivisection on him. Another researcher, Isabelle Ardant, opposes the idea, stating that it would be better to abduct the boy when he is older and place him in the Animus for 50 years so that Abstergo can study his lineage.

Assassin's Creed Valhalla 
In Assassin's Creed Valhalla, it is revealed that when Desmond sacrificed himself in December 2012 to save the Earth, only his physical form was killed, as his consciousness was transported into a computer simulation created by the Isu known as "The Grey." During his time there, Desmond forgot his original identity and was transformed into a being of pure light called The Reader, whose task is to analyze various branching timelines to determine ways of preventing future cataclysms. In 2020, the Assassin Layla Hassan enters the Grey via a supercomputer from an Isu temple in Norway in an attempt to slow the magnetism of the global aurora borealis device, which was activated by Desmond when he died. Here, Layla meets the Reader and shows him more possibilities and calculations based on timelines he had not explored. The Reader then tells Layla she has a minute to live, as the radiation from the chamber where the computer is located is killing her body. Layla accepts her fate and decides to stay in the Grey with the Reader to help him explore more timelines.

Additionally, the player can find and listen to two audio logs of Desmond on Layla's computer, recorded shortly before his death. In the first, he talks about his life as an Assassin and his lack of choice in the matter, which he finds ironic given the Brotherhood's advocation for free will, and expresses his belief that the Assassins have become more dogmatic and stagnant in time, as most have stopped thinking about the actual meaning of the Creed; despite this, he still believes in the Assassins' cause and considers that people sometimes need boundaries, as the complexity of life can prove too much for anyone to handle. In the second log, Desmond talks about his ancestors and how he feels overwhelmed after having relived so many different lives in a short amount of time, as well as how he doesn't consider himself special for being descended from the Isu and that anyone can join the Assassins and make a difference in the world.

Reception and analysis 
Desmond received mixed reviews from critics, primarily due to his uneven characterization and development. He was voted the 20th top character of the 2000s by Game Informer readers. PlayStation Universe rated him as one of the PlayStation 3's worst characters, saying: "While voiced admirably by the ubiquitous Nolan North, it's impossible to shake the feeling of pure monotony when stepping into Desmond's shoes when all you want to do is hop back in time and stab people in the face."

The significance of Desmond as an atypical video game protagonist and as a character study on posthumanism is analyzed by Aubrie Adams in the 2017 publication 100 Greatest Video Game Characters. Adams commented that as his mind travel through time and experiences the memories of his ancestors, aided by the technological innovations of science fiction plot devices like the Animus, his body appears to have become increasingly unnecessary throughout the franchise. From this view, the technology that enables him to transcend the biological limitations of his frail body taps into a cultural zeitgeist that desire the idea of extending life throughout technology. Adams cited the character's continued presence in the storylines of later games in spite of his apparent death in Assassin's Creed III, along with fan theories and official in-game lore which confirm the persistence of his consciousness in the virtual environment, which is indicative of his conclusive change into a posthuman character who transcended his trivial need for a physical form.

Adams highlighted the significance of the introduction of Desmond as a character during a time period when white hypermasculine player characters were the norm in the video game industry, emphasizing in particular his depiction as a subdued protagonist who is psychologically complex, and of an ambiguous ethnicity as the result of his diverse ancestral heritage. The story arc in the early Assassin's Creed titles centered around Desmond, where his identity gradually evolves from a blank state who subsumes the characteristics and skills of others into a highly skilled Master Assassin, is also marked by his evolving individuality as he comes to terms with his shifting personal identity and acceptance that he is part of a lineage that is bigger than the sum of its parts. Adams commented that there is a compelling depth to Desmond as character but only if players are willing to engage in the largely optional experiences that follow his psychological journey and illuminate the details of his past.

References

Bibliography 

 

Assassin's Creed characters
Fictional characters with retrocognition
Fictional aikidoka
Fictional karateka
Fictional judoka
Fictional taekwondo practitioners
Fictional hapkido practitioners
Fictional Krav Maga practitioners
Fictional American people in video games
Fictional European-American people
Fictional Chinese American people
Fictional Italian American people
Fictional Japanese American people
Fictional Syrian people
Fictional Arabs
Fictional Native American people in video games
Fictional bartenders
Fictional characters from South Dakota
Fictional slaves in video games
Hackers in video games
Fictional Iroquois people
Fictional teenage parents
Fictional traceurs and freerunners
Male characters in video games
Video game characters introduced in 2007
Video game mascots
Video game protagonists